Aleisha-Pearl Nelson (born 2 March 1990) is a New Zealand rugby union player. She plays for the Black Ferns and for the Auckland Storm.

Biography 
Nelson graduated from the Auckland University of Technology as a nurse.

Nelson made her Black Ferns debut on 23 November 2012 against England at Esher. She was named in the 2017 Women's Rugby World Cup squad. She was part of the winning team of the 2019 Women's Rugby Super Series.

Nelson played for the Blues against the Chiefs in the first-ever women's Super Rugby match in New Zealand on 1 May 2021. On 3 November 2021, She was named in the Blues squad for the inaugural Super Rugby Aupiki competition.

References

External links 
 Aleisha Nelson at Black Ferns

1990 births
Living people
New Zealand women's international rugby union players
New Zealand female rugby union players
Auckland rugby union players
Rugby union props